Ken Burmeister (June 3, 1947 – May 19, 2020) was an American college basketball coach. He was the head coach of the University of the Incarnate Word for 12 seasons from 2006 until 2018. 

Burmeister graduated from St. Mary's University, Texas and served on the staff of Lute Olson at Iowa and Arizona from 1979 to 1986. Burmeister coached at University of Texas at San Antonio from 1986 to 1990 and led the team to its first appearance in the NCAA Tournament in 1988, where they lost to Illinois. He served as an assistant coach at DePaul before taking over at Loyola (IL) in 1994. He posted a 40-71 record at Loyola and oversaw the team's move to Joseph J. Gentile Arena in 1996. Burmeister coached at Trinity University in San Antonio, Texas from 1998 to 1999. He died on May 19, 2020 from cancer.

Head coaching record

References

1947 births
2020 deaths
Arizona Wildcats men's basketball coaches
Basketball coaches from Texas
DePaul Blue Demons men's basketball coaches
Incarnate Word Cardinals men's basketball coaches
Iowa Hawkeyes men's basketball coaches
Loyola Ramblers men's basketball coaches
Northern Arizona University alumni
Trinity Tigers men's basketball coaches
UT Arlington Mavericks men's basketball coaches
UTSA Roadrunners men's basketball coaches
St. Mary's University, Texas alumni